The Internationaler Naturpark Bourtanger Moor-Bargerveen (engl. Bourtanger Moor-Bargerveen International Nature Park) is a nature reserve in the west of the German state Lower Saxony as well as in the North-East of the Netherlands. Mostly this nature reserve is spread out over the German counties Emsland, Grafschaft Bentheim and the Dutch province Drenthe.
The landscape within the nature park is characterised by big peat areas, heather, small lakes and a very low human population density.
The Bourtanger Moor-Bargerveen International Nature Park was founded on June 1, 2006.

Bourtanger Moor

The nature reserve is the home of several special plants like common cottongrass and drosera and endangered animals like the viviparous lizard, grass snake, short-eared owl and European nightjar can be found in this reserve.

Bargerveen

The Dutch part of the reserve was designated a protected area in 1992 as Natuurreservaat Bargerveen (Bargerveen Nature Reserve).

References

External links
http://www.naturpark-moor.eu (German)
http://www.umwelt.niedersachsen.de/master/C24290611_N24290672_L20_D0_I598.html (German)
http://www.umwelt.niedersachsen.de (German)
http://www.erdoel-erdgas-museum-twist.de (German)
http://www.moormuseum.de (German)
https://web.archive.org/web/20100415215906/http://www.bentheimer-landschaf.de/schutzgebiete.html (German)
https://web.archive.org/web/20070928044323/http://www.staatsbosbeheer.nl/ontdek/bijzonderenatuurgebieden/details.asp?LOC_ID=36 (Dutch)

Bogs of Lower Saxony
Nature parks in Lower Saxony
Nature reserves in Lower Saxony
Protected areas established in 2006
Transboundary protected areas
Landforms of Drenthe
Emmen, Netherlands
Bogs of the Netherlands